Donald Alexander (1928 – 9 May 2007) was a Scottish physician and researcher and a major figure in international thyroid research.

He studied at the University of Glasgow and graduated in 1951 being awarded the Cullen medal. He studied under Edward Wayne, professor of medicine at the University of Glasgow and he developed an academic interest in thyroid disease.

He then moved to the US to continue his research at the National Institutes of Health in Bethesda, Maryland where he worked on iodine metabolism. In 1964, he returned to Glasgow to study antithyroid drug action and perform metabolic studies. During this time, he pioneered the "block and replace" strategy for managing Graves' disease.

He retired in 1994, but continued to work as an advisor to the Abbey National in Glasgow which he only stopped at the end of 2006. He died on 9 May 2007.

References 

Scottish physiologists
Medical doctors from Glasgow
1928 births
2007 deaths
Alumni of the University of Glasgow
British expatriates in the United States
British endocrinologists